Willi Frommelt (born 18 November 1952) is a former Alpine skier from Liechtenstein who won a bronze medal in the slalom at the 1976 Olympics.

Curiously during his career, Frommelt had only one podium finish in the World Cup events but four at the Alpine Ski World Championships and in four different discilines.

Biography
Frommelt is a son of Christof Frommelt, a cross-country skier and the Olympic flag bearer for Liechtenstein at the 1948 Games. At his first Olympics, in 1972, he competed in the downhill, slalom and giant slalom, but with little success. Two years later he won the first alpine skiing medal for Liechtenstein at world championships, a bronze in the downhill, and in 1978 he won another bronze, in the giant slalom. In 1976, he received a world championships silver for his combined results in the downhill, giant slalom and slalom at the 1976 Olympics – world championships were then combined with Olympics in the Olympic years, but the combined results did not count for the Olympics. He also became third in the slalom race (awarded with an Olympic bronze, and a bronze in the World Championships) - therefore he could gain four medals in four different disciplines. In the slalom (stated above) he was in lead after the first leg. - His capturing the bronze in the FIS Alpine Skiing World Championships 1974 was a great surprise, he did start with bib number 17.

After retiring from competitions Frommelt graduated in business management and worked as a financial planner for the National Bank of Liechtenstein. He was also active in politics with the centre-right Fortschrittliche Bürgerpartei and served a term as a municipal councillor.

His brother Paul won another Olympic bronze medal for Liechtenstein, in 1988. His other brother, Peter, was international table tennis competitor.

References

External links
 
 

1952 births
Living people
Liechtenstein male alpine skiers
Olympic alpine skiers of Liechtenstein
Olympic bronze medalists for Liechtenstein
Olympic medalists in alpine skiing
Medalists at the 1976 Winter Olympics
Alpine skiers at the 1972 Winter Olympics
Alpine skiers at the 1976 Winter Olympics